The 2011–12 CBA season is the 17th CBA season. This season began on November 19, 2011, and ended on March 30, 2012.

Foreign players policy
All teams except Bayi Rockets can have two foreign players, while the bottom 5 teams of last season have an extra right to sign an Asian player. In addition, due to the NBA 2011 Lockout, any international player that signs to any CBA team have to abide by their contracts signed. The rule of using players in each game is described in this chart:

+ Including players from Hong Kong and Chinese Taipei.

Coaching changes

Regular Season Standings

All-star weekend

Rookie Challenge

 Guo Ailun was awarded the MVP of the game.

All-star game

 Unable to participate due to personal reasons, Aaron Brooks was named as the replacement for J. R. Smith.

 Unable to participate due to personal reasons, Han Dejun was named as the replacement for Mengke Bateer.

 Li Gen was awarded the MVP of the game.

Slam Dunk Contest

Three-Point Shootout

Skills Challenge

Statistics Leaders

Individual Statistic Leaders

Awards

Yearly Awards
CBA Most Valuable Player: Zhu Fangyu, Guangdong Southern Tigers
Rookie of the Year: Zhu Yanxi, Beijing Ducks
Coach of the Year: Min Lulei, Beijing Ducks & Yang Xuezeng, Shanxi Brave Dragons

Players of the week
The following players were named the Domestic and Foreign Players of the Week.

Playoffs

Teams in bold advanced to the next round. The numbers to the left of each team indicate the team's seeding in regular season, and the numbers to the right indicate the number of games the team won in that round. Home court advantage belongs to the team with the better regular season record; teams enjoying the home advantage are shown in italics.

References

External links
Official Website 
163 CBA Coverage
CBA China - 2011-12 Standings and Stats on Basketball-Reference.com

 
League
Chinese Basketball Association seasons
CBA